The GAVRT Program is a partnership between NASA’s Jet Propulsion Laboratory (JPL) and the Lewis Center for Educational Research (LCER). Based in California, GAVRT is an acronym for the Goldstone-Apple Valley Radio Telescope and provides a science investigation program for students K through 12. Students learn how to be part of a science team while they are making a real contribution to scientific knowledge by operating and collecting data on current NASA JPL missions to moons and planets in the Solar System.

Using the GoToMeeting platform, students take control of a 34-meter, 500 ton decommissioned NASA radio telescope to collect data for NASA's Jet Propulsion projects. Students collaborate with scientists who are working on the same mission and are recognized as part of the science team.

Current campaigns include studying black holes, planets, search for extraterrestrial life (SETI) and helping monitor the health of a space probes such as the Lunar Reconnaissance Orbiter, Cassini-Huygens space probe and the Juno space probe. This provides an opportunity for students to experience real science, to learn that science is an ongoing process, not just memorizing facts (Lewis, 2017).

Teacher training and certification is free and is available to all teachers across the world to learn the basics of radio astronomy, and are taught how to control the telescope. Teachers are provided free broad-based, multidisciplinary program curriculum which may be used as is, or individually adapted to fit their classroom environment that meets National Science Education Standards. Ongoing support for Teachers is provided by interactive website, email and phone communications. (Lewis, 2017).

Students recognize that they are part of a scientific team and have the opportunity to meet with, ask questions and discuss findings with NASA/JPL scientists and engineers via online communication programs such as SKYPE. Students work together in teams to plan the experiment, assign job responsibilities, collect and analyze the data obtained from the telescope. The radio telescope can be seen to move in real time via a projector. Students collaborate with mission control and take control of the telescope, they can see it move into position real time.

References

Lewis Center for Educational Research (2017),GAVR Goldstone Apple Valley Radio Telescope About GAVRT. Retrieved from http://www.lewiscenter.org/Global-Programs/GAVRT/index.php
Walker, A. (2009,August 31) 
A Learning Space for Learning About Space Retrieved from https://www.edutopia.org/charter-school-observatory-lewis.
National Aeronautics and Space Administration (2017) What is GAVRT retrieved from http://www2.jpl.nasa.gov/radioastronomy/whatis.htm
National Aeronautics and Space Administration (2016, March 10) retrieved from 
https://www.nasa.gov/directorates/heo/scan/communications/outreach/students/Accordion1_text.html

NASA groups, organizations, and centers